The participants of the 1925 Tour de France were divided into two groups: 39 cyclists were riding in sponsored teams, and 91 rode as touriste-routiers. The teams did not have equal size; the largest team, J.B. Louvet, consisted of eight cyclists, while the smallest team, J.Alavoine-Dunlop, had only one cyclist, Jean Alavoine himself. There were 57 French, 34 Belgian, 28 Italian, 5 Swiss, 5 Luxembourgian and 1 Spanish cyclists.

Cyclists

By team

By starting number

By nationality

References

1925 Tour de France
1925